Proozaena is a genus of beetles in the family Carabidae, containing the following species:

 Proozaena cerdai Deuve, 2005
 Proozaena lata Deuve, 2004
 Proozaena nigricornis Deuve, 2004
 Proozaena parallela (Chaudoir, 1848)

References

Paussinae